The Florida Agency for Health Care Administration (AHCA) is the chief health policy and planning entity for the U.S. state of Florida. The agency was created by the Florida Legislature as part of the Health Care Reform Act of 1992.  The agency is tasked with managing the state's Medicaid program as well as overseeing the licensure of the state's health care facilities.

See also
 Florida Department of Health

References

Florida Department of Health